These are the number-one ranked albums by week in the United States in 1952 according to the Billboard Best Selling Pop Albums chart for both 33 1/3 and 45 RPM records.

Chart history

See also
1952 in music
List of Billboard number-one singles of 1952

Notes
November 1, 1952: Liberace at the Piano and I'm in the Mood for Love tied for number one for Best Selling 45 RPM album.

References

1952
United States Albums